The Territory Rugby League Stadium is a proposed football stadium in Marrara, Northern Territory, Australia. It is scheduled to open in 2023 as the home ground of NRL Northern Territory.

The Deadly Cup was played there.

References

External links

2019 establishments in Australia
Sports venues completed in 2019
Sports venues in Darwin, Northern Territory
Rugby league stadiums in Australia
Proposed sports venues in Australia
Stadiums under construction